1982 Empress's Cup Final was the 4th final of the Empress's Cup competition. The final was played at Nishigaoka Soccer Stadium in Tokyo on March 21, 1983. Shimizudaihachi SC won the championship.

Overview
Defending champion Shimizudaihachi SC won their 3rd title, by defeating FC Jinnan 6–0. Shimizudaihachi SC won the title for 3 years in a row.

Match details

See also
1982 Empress's Cup

References

Empress's Cup
1982 in Japanese women's football